The Chief of Navy (MC) is the most senior appointment in the Swedish Navy. The position Chief of Navy was introduced in 1936 and the current form in 2014.

History
Until 1936 the Swedish monarch was the Supreme Commander of the Swedish Armed Forces and had formally maintained the Chief of the Navy position together with the Chief of the Military Office of the Minister of Defence in the Ministry of Defence, which is in fact maintained the position. The position of a single professional "Chief of the Navy" (CM) was established in 1936 in accordance with the Defence Act of 1936. The position of Chief of the Navy existed from 1936 to 1994 and during this time it was his responsibility to lead the navy units production and development. During the period 1936 to 1961 the Chief of the Navy also had an operational commanding responsibility for the naval forces.

Following a larger reorganization of the Swedish Armed Forces in 1994, the staff agency Chief of the Navy ceased to exist as an independent agency. Instead, the post Chief of Navy Command was created at the then newly instituted Swedish Armed Forces Headquarters. In 1998, the Swedish Armed Forces was again reorganized. Most of the duties of the Chief of Navy Command were transferred to the newly instituted post of "Inspector General of the Navy". The post is similar to that of the "Inspector General of the Swedish Army" and the "Inspector General of the Swedish Air Force". It was later renamed to "Inspector of the Navy" on 1 January 2003.

On 1 January 2014, the "Chief of Navy" (MC) position was reinstated in the Swedish Armed Forces. The position has not the same duties as before.

Tasks

Tasks of the Chief of Navy:
Lead the units which the Chief of Swedish Armed Forces Training and Development has distributed
To the Chief of Swedish Armed Forces Training and Development propose the development of the units' abilities
Being the foremost representative of the units
Represent the units and the area of ability in international contacts

Heraldry
A command flag of the Chief of Navy, drawn by Brita Grep and embroidered by hand by the company Libraria, was introduced during the reign of Gustaf VI Adolf (1950–1973). Blazon: "Fessed in yellow and blue; on yellow two blue batons of command with sets of yellow crowns placed two and one in saltire, on blue an anchor erect cabled over two gun barrels of older pattern in saltire, all yellow."

A new command flag manufactured by Handarbetets Vänner Ateljé, which is a subcontractor to the Swedish Army Museum, was completed in 2020. The flag is embroidered by Jennie Jakobsson and Katarina Öberg. Parts of the preparatory work were done by Anna Eriksson and printed by Marie-Louise Sjöblom. The model drawing was made by Henrik Dahlström, who previously served at the National Archives of Sweden and who is now a heraldic artist and graphic designer at the Swedish Armed Forces Headquarters. The new command flag was nailed in solemn forms at the Maritime Museum in Stockholm on 10 September 2021 with six former Chiefs of Navy: vice admiral Dick Börjesson (1990–1994), vice admiral Peter Nordbeck (1994–1998), rear admiral Anders Grenstad (2005–2011), vice admiral Jan Thörnqvist (2011–2016), rear admiral Jens Nykvist (2016–2020), and current Chief of Navy, rear admiral Ewa Skoog Haslum (2020–present).

List of chiefs

|-style="text-align:center;"
!colspan=7|Chief of the Navy (Chefen för marinen)

 

|-style="text-align:center;"
!colspan=7|Chief of Navy Command (Chef för marinledningen)

|-style="text-align:center;"
!colspan=7|Inspector General of the Navy (Generalinspektör för marinen)

|-style="text-align:center;"
!colspan=7|Inspector of the Navy (Marininspektör)

|-style="text-align:center;"
!colspan=7|Chief of Navy (Marinchef)

List of deputy chiefs

|-style="text-align:center;"
!colspan=7|Deputy Inspector General of the Navy (Ställföreträdande generalinspektör för marinen)

|-style="text-align:center;"
!colspan=7|Deputy Chief of Navy (Ställföreträdande marinchef)

See also
Chief of Army (Sweden)
Chief of Air Force (Sweden)

References

Notes

Print

Sweden
Swedish Navy
 
Military appointments of Sweden